Frances Smith may refer to:

 Frances Kirby Smith (1785–1875), mother of general Edmund Kirby Smith and a confederate spy
 Frances Dora Smith (1832–1922), British noblewoman and grandmother of Queen Elizabeth II
 Frances Hagell Smith (1877–1948), New Zealand missionary teacher
 Polly Smith (photographer) (Frances Sutah Smith; 1908–1980), American photographer
 Frances Smith (missing person) (1910–1928), missing person who was found dead
 Frances Dean Smith (1922–2009), American poet
 Frances Smith (golfer) (1924–1978), British Ladies Amateur Golf champion

See also
 Frances Strickland (Frances Smith Strickland, born 1941), First Lady of the U.S. state of Ohio
 Fanny Smith (born 1992), Swiss skier
 Francis Smith (disambiguation)